Banora  is a town and sub-prefecture in the Dinguiraye Prefecture in the Faranah Region of western Guinea. As of 2014 it had a population of 32,998 people.

References

Sub-prefectures of the Faranah Region